Ardozyga orthanotos is a species of moth in the family Gelechiidae. It was described by Oswald Bertram Lower in 1900. It is found in Australia, where it has been recorded from Victoria.

The forewings are whitish ochreous, partly mixed with pale ochreous, with some scattered fuscous and dark fuscous scales. There are indications of dark fuscous marks on the costa at one-fifth and two-fifths and there is a somewhat undefined black streak along the fold from the base to two-fifths, and another in the disc from above the apex of this to three-fourths. There are also some blackish scales about the apex. The hindwings are dark fuscous, somewhat lighter towards the tips, towards the dorsum ochreous tinged and with a short transparent streak from the middle of the base.

References

Ardozyga
Moths described in 1900
Moths of Australia